Aznagulovo (Aźnağol) is a rural locality (a village) in Sermenevsky Selsoviet, Beloretsky District, Bashkortostan, Russia. The population was 290 as of 2010. There are 3  streets.

Geography 
Aznagulovo is located 34 km southwest of Beloretsk (the district's administrative centre) by road. Sermenevo is the nearest rural locality.

References 

Rural localities in Beloretsky District